The 1868 Illinois gubernatorial election was the fourteenth election for this office.  Republican nominee, John M. Palmer defeated the Democratic nominee John R. Eden.

At this time in Illinois history, the Lieutenant Governor was elected on a separate ballot from the governor. This would remain so until the 1970 constitution.

Results

References

Gubernatorial
1868
Illinois
November 1868 events